Elizabeth R is a BBC television drama serial of six 90-minute plays starring Glenda Jackson as Queen Elizabeth I of England. It was first broadcast on BBC2 from February to March 1971, through the ABC in Australia and broadcast in America on PBS's Masterpiece Theatre. The series has been repeated several times, most recently from 17 February 2021, by BBC Four to celebrate the show's fiftieth anniversary.

Production
Elizabeth R was filmed at a variety of locations including Penshurst Place which doubled as the queen's castle grounds and Chiddingstone in Kent, though all the interiors were recorded at the BBC Television Centre.

The first episode was broadcast on 17 February 1971, beginning on screen with the year 1549 as the setting, with the then Princess Elizabeth's difficult ascent to the throne of England nine years later. The final episode was shown on 24 March 1971, the 368th anniversary of the Queen's death on March 24, 1603. It was repeated almost immediately in response to audience demand.

The series followed the successful Six Wives of Henry VIII (1970), with several performers reprising their roles in Elizabeth R (all in the first episode) from the earlier series, notably John Ronane as Thomas Seymour, 1st Baron Seymour of Sudeley, Bernard Hepton as Cranmer, Basil Dignam as Bishop Gardiner and Rosalie Crutchley as Catherine Parr.

In February 1972, Elizabeth R first aired in the United States on Masterpiece Theatre, then hosted by Alistair Cooke on PBS. In the summer of 1972, it was rebroadcast with commercials on the New York local station WOR-TV Channel 9.

Glenda Jackson's performance in the title role won her two Emmy Awards—for Best Actress in a Drama Series and Best Actress in a Movie/TV Special (for the episode "Shadow in the Sun"). The series itself won the Emmy for the Best Dramatic Series in 1972 (the first British TV series ever to win the American TV award, before Upstairs, Downstairs carried the award two years later). At around the same time, Jackson also played the part of Elizabeth in the film Mary, Queen of Scots (1971).

Costume designer Elizabeth Waller won an Emmy for her designs; she recreated many of the historical Elizabeth's actual gowns, adapting them from a number of the Queen's official portraits. They later went on display at Hampton Court Palace.

Elizabeth R featured many well-known British actors, including Malcolm McFee, Michael Williams, Margaretta Scott, John Woodvine, James Laurenson, Angela Thorne, Brian Wilde, Robin Ellis, Robert Hardy and Peter Egan.

The series was parodied in Monty Python's Flying Circus in an absurdist sketch where a Japanese film director, disguised unconvincingly as Luchino Visconti, forces his cast to perform as Queen Elizabeth's court while sitting on motor-scooters and speaking Engrish. Therefore, the title was changed to "Erizabeth L".

Elizabeth R was first released for DVD Region 1 during 2001 by BBC Warner and then re-released by BBC Worldwide in 2011. In DVD Region 2, it was issued by 2 Entertain in 2006.

Cast
Note: This list is incomplete.

 Glenda Jackson as Elizabeth I of England
 Robert Hardy as Robert Dudley, Earl of Leicester
 Ronald Hines as Sir William Cecil, Lord Burghley
 Stephen Murray as Sir Francis Walsingham
 John Shrapnel as Thomas Radclyffe, 3rd Earl of Sussex
 Bernard Horsfall as Sir Christopher Hatton
 Robin Ellis as Robert Devereux, Earl of Essex
 Jason Kemp as Edward VI of England
 Daphne Slater as Mary I of England
 Vivian Pickles as Mary, Queen of Scots
 Hamilton Dyce as Amyas Paulet
 Rachel Kempson as Kat Ashley
 Peter Jeffrey as Philip II of Spain
 Margaretta Scott as Catherine de' Medici
 Michael Williams as François, Duke of Anjou (and Alençon)
 James Laurenson as Jean de Simier
 Jill Balcon as Lady Cobham, Lady-in-Waiting
 David Collings as Anthony Babington
 Bernard Holley as Gilbert Gifford
 David Nettheim as Thomas Phelippes
 John Graham as William Davison
 John Woodvine as Sir Francis Drake
 Peter Howell as Charles Howard, 1st Earl of Nottingham
 John Nettleton as Sir Francis Bacon
 Angela Thorne as Lettice Knollys
 Hugh Dickson as Robert Cecil, 1st Earl of Salisbury
 Nicholas Selby as Sir Walter Raleigh
 Clifford Rose as Thomas Egerton, 1st Viscount Brackley
 John Ronane as Thomas Seymour, 1st Baron Seymour of Sudeley
 Bernard Hepton as Archbishop Cranmer
 Basil Dignam as Bishop Gardiner
 John Ruddock as Archbishop Whitgift
 Rosalie Crutchley as Catherine Parr
 Brian Wilde as Richard Topcliffe
 David Garfield as John Ballard
 Peter Egan as Henry Wriothesley, 3rd Earl of Southampton
 Hayden Jones as Charles Blount, 8th Baron Mountjoy
 Patrick O'Connell as Hugh O'Neill, Earl of Tyrone
 Sonia Fraser as Elizabeth Wriothesley, Countess of Southampton
 Shirley Dixon as Penelope Rich, Lady Rich
 Judith South as Frances Radclyffe, Countess of Sussex
 Raf De La Torre as John Dee
 Stanley Lenore as Sir Robert Tyrwhitt
 Nicolette Bernard as Lady Elizabeth Tyrwhitt
 Kevin Brennan as Bridges
 Julian Holloway as Antoine de Noailles
 Brendan Barry as Simon Renard 
 Robert Garrett as Thomas Wyatt the Younger
 Alan Foss as Sir Henry Bedingfeld
 Philip Brack as John Dudley, 1st Duke of Northumberland
 Ian Barritt as Fowler
 Blake Butler as Thomas Parry
 Richard Parry as Guard
 Sarah Frampton as Lady Jane Grey
 Robert Barry as Lord Guildford Dudley
 Michael Culver as John Tregannon
 Esmond Knight as Bishop Álvaro de la Quadra

Episodes

References

External links
 
 

1971 British television series debuts
1971 British television series endings
1970s British drama television series
BBC television royalty dramas
Cultural depictions of Edward VI of England
Cultural depictions of Elizabeth I
Cultural depictions of Mary I of England
English-language television shows
Primetime Emmy Award for Outstanding Drama Series winners
Television set in Tudor England
Cultural depictions of Lord Guildford Dudley
Cultural depictions of Lady Jane Grey